DMC World DJ Championships is an annual DJ competition hosted by Disco Mix Club (DMC) which began in 1985.

Championships were sponsored internationally by Technics, but in 2010 Technics has been replaced by Serato and Rane. From 2011, the vinyl emulation software Serato Scratch Live can be used during the competition in addition to traditional vinyl.

In 2020, due to the COVID-19 pandemic the DMC World DJ Championship are being held exclusively online.

DJ Champions

DMC World DJ Champions

1985 - London, UK - 1. Roger Johnson (UK North) 2. Martin Sweeney (UK South) 3. Roger Turin (Sweden)
1986 - London, UK — 1. DJ Cheese (USA), 2. Chad Jackson (UK), 3. Orlando Voorn (Netherlands)
1987 - London, UK — 1. Chad Jackson (UK), 2. Joe Rodriguez (US), 3. Ken "The Duke" Larsen (Denmark)
1988 - London, UK — 1. Cash Money (USA), 2. Mich "Cut-father" Hansen (Denmark), 3. All-Star Fresh (Netherlands)
1989 - London, UK — 1. Cut master Swift (UK), 2. Aladdin (USA), 3. Eliot Ness (Finland)
1990 - London, UK — 1. David (Germany), 2. Francesco Zappalà (Italy), 3. Reckless (UK)
1991 - London, UK — 1. David (Germany), 2. Q-Bert (USA), 3. Yoshi (Japan)
1992 - London, UK — 1. Rock Steady DJs (USA), 2. Crazy Fast Nefis (France), 3. KK (Italy)
1993-1994 - London, UK — 1. Dream Team (USA), 2. Alliance Ethnic (France), 3. Cutting Crew (Denmark)
1995 - London, UK — 1. Roc Raida (USA) 2. Noize (Denmark), 3. Alliance Ethnik (France)
1996 - Rimini, Italy — 1. Noize (Denmark), 2. DJ Tommy (Hong Kong), 3. Roc Raida (USA)
1997 - Rimini, Italy — 1. A-Trak (Canada), 2. Crazy B (France), 3. Pogo (UK)
1998 - Paris, France — 1. Craze (USA), 2. Crazy B (France), 3. A-Trak (Canada)
1999 - New York, USA — 1. Craze (USA), 2. Tony Vegas (UK), 3. P-Trix (USA)
2000 - London, UK — 1. Craze (USA), 2. Dexta (Australia), 3. Mr. Thing (UK) 
2001 - London, UK — 1. Plus One (UK), 2. Klever (USA), 3T. kentaro (Japan), 3T. P-Money (New Zealand)
2002 - London, UK — 1. Kentaro (Japan), 2. Skully (UK), 3. Dopey (Canada)
2003 - 1. Dopey (Canada), 2. Enferno (USA), 3. Quest (UK)
2004 - 1. Ie.Merg (USA), 2. DJ Rafik (Germany), 3. Dopey (Canada)
2005 - 1. Ie.Merg (USA), 2. Pfel (France), 3. DJ Izoh (Japan)
2006 - 1. Netik (France), 2. Yasa (Japan), 3. Rafik (Germany)
2007 - 1. DJ Rafik (Germany), 2. Yasa (Japan), 3. DJ Fly (France) 
2008 - 1. DJ Fly (France), 2. Slyce (USA), 3. Co-Ma (Japan) 
2009 - 1. DJ Shiftee (USA), 2. Co-Ma (Japan), 3. DJ LigOne (France) 
2010 - 1. DJ LigOne (France), 2. Co-Ma (Japan), 3. DJ Blu (Japan)
2011 - 1. DJ Vajra (USA), 2. DJ Izoh (Japan), 3. Co-Ma (Japan)
2012 - 1. DJ Izoh (Japan), 2. Precision (USA), 3. Ritchie Ruftone (UK)
2013 - 1. DJ Fly (France), 2. Ritchie Ruftone (UK), 3. Jon1st (UK)
2014 - 1. Mr. Switch (UK), 2. I-Dee (USA), 3. Vekked (Canada)
2015 - 1. Vekked (Canada), 2. Spell (New Zealand), 3. Precision (USA)
2016 - 1. DJ Yuto (Japan), 2. DJ Brace (Canada), 3. DJ Traps (USA)
2017 - 1. DJ Rena (Japan) - youngest ever world champion aged 12, 2. DJ Skillz (France), 3. Spell (New Zealand)
2018 - 1. DJ Skillz (France), 2. DJ Fummy (Japan), 3. DJ Rena (Japan)
2019 - 1. DJ Skillz (France), 2. K-Swizz (New Zealand), 3. Erik Jay (Brazil)
2020 - 1. DJ Skillz (France), 2. JFB (UK), 3. K-Swizz (New Zealand)
2021 - 1. JFB (UK), 2. K-Swizz (New Zealand), 3. Erik Jay (Brazil)
2022 - 1. K-Swizz (New Zealand), 2.IS-K (Japan) 3. DJ Topic (France)

Breakdown by country (33 in total):
 12 USA 
 7 France
 6 UK
 4 Japan
 3 Germany
 3 Canada
 1 Denmark
 1 New Zealand

UK DJ Champions
(and world rankings)
1985 - Roger Johnson (1st)
1986 - Chad Jackson (2nd)
1987 - CJ Mackintosh
1988 - 1. Cutmaster Swift (5th), 2. Owen D, 3. Scratch Professor
1989 - 1. Cutmaster Swift (1st), 2. DJ Pogo, 3. DJ Trix
1990 - 1. Reckless (3rd), 2. DJ Pogo, 3. DJ Trix
1991 - 1. Reckless, 2. DJ Excel, 3. Olabean
1992 - DJ Sparra
1993-94 - DJ Sparra
1994-95 - 1. DJ Kofi, 2. First Rate, 3. Def K
1996 - 1. Cutmaster Swift, 2. DJ Kofi, 3. Prime Cuts
1997 - 1. DJ Pogo (3rd), 2. DJ Excel
1998 - 1. Prime Cuts, 2. DJ Excel, 3. Tony Vegas
1999 - 1. Tony Vegas (2nd), 2. Plus One, 3. Prime Cuts
2000 - 1. Mr Thing (3rd), 2. Plus One, 3. Mad Cut, 4. Woody, 5. Tigerstyle, 6. Richie Ruftone
2001 - 1. Plus One (1st), 2. Woody, 3. Skully, 4. Mad Cut, 5. Theory, 6. Prime Time
2002 - 1. Skully (2nd), 2. Woody, 3. Tigerstyle, 4. Quest, 5. Richie Ruftone, 6. Clockwork
2003 - Quest (3rd)
2004 - DJ Blakey
2005 - Muzzell
2006 - Asian Hawk
2007 - JFB
2008 - Skully
2009 - Jeppa
2010 - Jeppa
2011 - 1. JFB, 2. Ritchie Ruftone, 3. Jeppa
2012 - 1. Ritchie Ruftone (3rd), 2. Furious P, 3. Asian Hawk
2013 - 1. Ritchie Ruftone (2nd), 2. Switch, 3. Mighty Atom / P-Nuts
2013 - Jon1st (3rd)
2014 - Ritchie Ruftone
2014 - Mr. Switch (1st)
2015 - JFB + Ritchie Ruftone - joint 1st place 3. DJ Rasp
2016 - Ritchie Ruftone
2017 - DJ Rasp
2018 - El Statiko
2019 - 1. Mike L, 2. El Statiko, 3. DJ Koncept
2020 - 1. JFB (2nd), 2. Ritchie Ruftone, 3. Tommy P-Nuts
2021 - Tommy P-Nuts
2022 - Tommy P-Nuts

US DJ Champions
(and world rankings)
1986 - DJ Cheese (1st)—no US Final this year, invited by Tony Prince due to winning the 1984 NMS
1987 - Joe Rodriguez (2nd)
1988 - San Diego, CA — 1. Cash Money (1st), 2. Bad Boy Bill, 3. Lightning Rich
1989 - Chicago, IL — 1. Aladdin (2nd), 2. Miz, 3. Bad Boy Bill
1990 - New York, NY — 1. Baby G, 2. Steve Dee, 3. Diamond J
1991 - Chicago, IL — 1. Q-Bert (2nd), 2. Rectangle, 3. Boogie Boy
1992 - New York, NY — 1. Rocksteady DJs (Mix Master Mike, Q-Bert, and Apollo) (1st), 2. Roc Raida
1993-94 - New York, NY — 1. Rectangle
1994-95 - New York, NY — 1. Roc Raida (1st), 2. Shortkut, 3. Ghetto
1996 - San Francisco, CA — 1. Swamp, 2. Mista Sinista, 3. Babu
1997 - New York, NY — 1. Slyce (5th), 2. Total Eclipse, 3. Craze
1998 - New York, NY — 1. Craze (1st), 2. Shortkut, 3. Dummy
1999 - San Francisco, CA — 1. P-Trix (3rd), 2. Spictakular, 3. Slyce
2000 - New York, NY — 1. Klever, 2. P-Trix, 3. Jay Slim
2001 - San Francisco, CA — 1. Klever (2nd), 2. Presyce, 3. Infamous
2002 - New York, NY — 1. Perseus, 2. Precision, 3. Smallz
2003 - Washington, DC — 1. Enferno (2nd), 2. Vajra, 3. Teeko
2004 - Ie.Merg (1st)
2005 - New York, NY - 1. Kico, 2. Perseus, 3. Donnie D
2006 - Fred Funk
2007 - Precision
2008 - Slyce (2nd)
2009 - Shiftee (1st)
2010 - Etronik
2011 - 1. Chris Karns (f/k/a Vajra) (1st), 2. I-Dee, 3. Precision 
2012 - 1. Precision (2nd), 2. I-Dee, 3. DJ Manwell
2013 - 1. Esquire, 2. SpareChange, 3. Ease
2014 - 1. I-Dee (2nd), 2. Dwells, 3. Ease
2015 - 1. Precision (3rd), 2. DJ Manwell, 3. Dwells
2016 - 1. Traps (3rd), 2. Perly, 3. SpareChange 
2017 - 1. Perly (1st Woman to win USA title), 2. Dwells, 3. Shmeeze
2018 - 1. Throdown, 2. FlipFlop, 3. Perly
2019 - 1. Throdown, 2. Toltech, 3. DJ Ragoza
2020 - DJ Immortal
2021 - Precision
2022 - Perly (1st Woman to win 2nd U.S. Title)

Australian DJ Champions
1988 - Drew Muirhead
1989 - John Alsop
1990 - Brian "A.S.K." Patrick
1992 - KC
1993-94 - KC
1996 - 3 DJs (KC,ASK,Skizo)
1997 - Dexta
1998 - Dexta
1999 - Dexta
2000 - Dexta (2nd)
2001 - Samrai
2001 - Dirty Duo (JRED, Selekt)
2002 - Selekt
2002 - Dirty Duo (JRED, Selekt)
2003 - Staen 1
2003 - Dirty Duo (JRED, Selekt)
2004 - Staen 1
2004 - Dirty Duo (JRED, Selekt)
2005 - Staen 1
2005 - Dirty Duo (JRED, Selekt)
2006 - DJ Perplex
2007 - DJ Perplex
2008 - DJ Perplex
(Note: No DMC Competition in AUS from 2009 - 2011)
2012 - DJ BTwo
2013 - DJ BTwo
2014 - DJ BTwo
2015 - Broke
2016 - DJ Osyris
2017 - DJ Osyris
2018 - DJ Midsole
2019 - DJ Wallzee
2020 - DJ Wallzee
2021 - Wild Birch

Belgium DJ Champions
1986 - Kris Kastaar (6th)
1987 - Kris Kastaar
1988 - Phil Watts
1989 - Daddy K
1990 - Daddy K
1991 - Ivan "DJ Sake" Bens
1992 - Steven Lemmens & Raf Verelst
1997 - Joss
1998 - Daddy K
1999 - Joss
2000 - Damented
2001 - Magicut
2002 - Damented
2003 - Magicut

Canada DJ Champions

(and world ranking)
1989 - Jam On Strong
1992 - Ground Control (team)
1996 - D-Scratch
1997 - A-Trak (1st)
1998 - Lil' Jaz
1999 - DJ Wax
2000 - DJ Pump
2001 - JR Flo
2002 - DJ Dopey (3rd)
2003 - DJ Dopey (1st)
2004 - DJ Dopey (3rd) - Defending champion
2004 - DJ Brace
2005 - DJ Drastik
2006 - Wundrkut
2007 - DJ Shub
2008 - DJ Shub
2009 - DJ Makeway
2010 - N/A
2011 - DJ Vekked
2012 - DJ Vekked
2013 - DJ Vekked
2014 - DJ Vekked
2015 - DJ Vekked (1st)
2016 - DJ Brace (2nd)
2017 - Jimmi Riggz
2018 - Jimmi Riggz
2019 - Wunderkut
2020 - DJ All Good
2021 - Jimmi Riggz
2022 - DJ T JR

Denmark DJ Champions

1986 - Cutfather
1987 - Ken “The Duke” Larsen (3rd)
1988 - Cutfather (2nd)
1989 - Soulshock
1990 - Uggerløse
1991 - Uggerløse
1992 - Knud
1993-94 - Cutting Crew (3rd)
1995 - Noize (2nd)
1996 - Noize (1st)
1997 - Copenhagen Scratch Masters
1998 - Static
1999 - Static
2000 - Noize
2001 - Shine
2002 - Turkman Souljah
2003 - Turkman Souljah
2004 - Turkman Souljah
2005 - Direct
2006 - Direct
2007 - Diverse
2008 - Direct
2009 - DJ Graded
2010 - DJ Graded
2011 - DJ Graded
2012 - DJ Graded
2013 - KCL
2014 - DJ Credit
2015 - DJ Credit
2016 - DJ Credit
2017 - DJ Graded
2018 - DJ Credit
2019 - DJ NeedleSplit
2020 - DJ FMD

Finland DJ Champions
1967 - Jyräys (Jyrki Hämäläinen)
1977 - Dj Edward (Markku Vesala)
1983 - Salsa (Tero Sinisalo)
1987 - Dj Kaippa (Kari Kaivola)
1988 - Dj Käpä (Kari Vesala)
1989 - Eliot Ness
1990 - Eliot Ness
1991 - Eliot Ness
1995 - JS-16 (Jaakko Salovaara)
1997 - Dj Peltsi (Mikko Peltola)
1998 - Tico (Antti Anttonen)
2000 - DJ Anselmi (Anselmi Kuusisto)
2001 - Sampl (Sami Pitkänen)
2002 - Sampl (Sami Pitkänen)

France DJ Champions
1986 - Dee Nasty
1987 - Dee Nasty
1988 - Dee Nasty
1989 - Jimmy Jay
1990 - DJ Max
1991 - Crazy B
1992 - Crazy Fast Nefis (2nd)
1993-94 - Alliance Ethnik (2nd)
1994-95 - LF Pee
1996 - Crazy B 
1997 - Crazy B (2nd)
1998 - Crazy B (2nd)
1999 - DJ Pone
2000 - DJ Pone
2001 - DJ Pone
2002 - DJ Pone
2003 - DJ Gero
2004 - DJ Gero
2005 - DJ Pfel (2nd)
2006 - DJ Netik (1st)
2007 - DJ Fly (3rd)
2008 - DJ Fly (1st)
2009 - LigOne (3rd)
2010 - LigOne (1st)
2011 - DJ Skillz
2012 - DJ Skillz
2013 - DJ Fly (1st)
2014 - Groove Sparkz
2015 - DJ Skillz
2016 - DJ Skillz
2017 - DJ Skillz (2nd)
2018 - DJ Skillz (1st)
2019 - Adjectif
2020 - Tony J Cut

Germany DJ Champions
1988 - Romeo Maramigi
1989 - Cool Cut
1990 - David (1st)
1991 - MPK
1992 - Shahin
1993-94 - Shahin
1994-95 - Splinta
1996 - Ray-D & Mem-Brain
1997 - Ray-D
1998 - Angelo Farce
1999 - G-Spot
2000 - Razor
2001 - Kid Fresh
2002 - 1. M-Tech, 2. J-Bounce, 3. Rafik
2003 - 1. J-Bounce, 2. Rasgunyado 3. Rafik
2004 - Rafik (2nd)
2005 - Pro-Zeiko
2006 - DJ Rafik (3rd)
2007 - DJ Rafik (1st)
2008 - DJ Rob Bankz
2009 - DJ Clear
2010 - DJ Crazy Cuts
2011 - Short-T
2012 - Short-T
2013 - N/A
2014 - N/A
2015 - N/A
2016 - S-Trix
2017 - DJ Robert Smith

Greece DJ Champions
1991 - Sparky T
1992 - Supreme Team
1993-94 - Supreme Team
1995 - Smartie
1996 - Sparky T
1997 - Sparky T
1998 - Sparky T
1999 - Sparky T
2000 - Kid Stretch
2001 - Expert

Holland DJ Champions
1986 - Orlando Voorn [3rd]
1987 - Orlando Voorn
1988 - Guan Elzoom (All-Star Fresh) [3rd]
1989 - Erick Eerdhuijzen
1990 - DCS
1991 - DCS
1992 - Voodoo Child & Pavo
1996 - Aux II
1997 - Aux II
1998 - Rockid
1999 - Kypski
2000 - Rockid
2001 - Rockid
2002 - Rockid
2003 - Savage
2004 - Irie
2005 - Irie
2006 - DJ Rachi

Hong Kong DJ Champions
1988 - Simon Choi
1989 - Kenvis Leung
1990 - Kenvis Leung
1991 - DJ Tommy
1992 - DJ Tommy
1993-94 - Jambox (Team)
1994-95 - Janva Tam
1996 - DJ Tommy (2nd)
1998 - DJ Galaxy
1999 - DJ Galaxy
2000 - DJ Frankie
2001 - DJ Beware
2002 - DJ Beware
2003 - DJ Beware
2004 - Lazyming 
2005 - Lazyming 
2006 - Mikey
2007 - Mikey
2008 - DJ Soda (last round)

Ireland DJ Champions
1990 - Mek
1991 - Mek
1992 - Mek
1998 - Wool
1999 - Mek
2000 - JP
2002 - Tu-Ki
2003 - Tu-Ki

Italy DJ Champions
1987 - Silver
1988 - Lorenzo Bossina
1989 - Cutmaster G
1990 - Francesco Zappala (2nd)
1991 - DJ Trip
1992 - KK (3rd; Team)
1993-94 - Daniele Mondello
1994-95 - Daniele Mondello
1996 - Black Sun (Team)
1997 - DJ Nike
1998 - DJ Kollasso
1999 - DJ Inesha
2000 - DJ Inesha
2001 - DJ Myke
2002 - DJ Myke
2003 - N/A
2004 - DJ Gengis
2005 - N/A
2006 - N/A
2007 - DJ Craim
2008 - DJ Craim
2009 - Mandrayq
2010 - Mandrayq
2011 - Mandrayq
2012 - Mandrayq
2013 - DJ Bicchio
2014 - DJ Bicchio
2015 - DJ P-Kut
2016 - DJ Kün-Kut
2017 - DJ Ghost
2018 - Antares Color
2019 - Dj Ghost
2019 - Dj Bront  (Battle For Supremacy)
2020 - Dj Bront

Japan DJ Champions
(And world rankings)
1990 - DJ Yoshi
1991 - DJ Yoshi (3)
1992 - DJ Ta-Shi (5)
1993/1994 - Ta-Shi & Yoshi
1995 - Norito
1996 - DJ Takada
1997 - DJ Akakabe (4)
1998 - 1. Akakabe (4th), 2. Shin, 3. Hinga Higa, 4. Micky, 5. Taiji 
1999 - DJ Takada
2000 - DJ Hanger
2001 - DJ Kentaro (T3)
2002 - DJ Kentaro (1)
2003 - DJ Yasa
2004 - 1. Taiji, 2. Yasa, 3. Hi-C
2005 - DJ Izoh (3)
2006 - DJ Yasa (2)
2007 - DJ Yasa (2)
2007 - DJ Miya Jima
2008 - Co-Ma (3)
2009 - Co-Ma (2)
2010 - Co-Ma (2)
2010 - DJ Blu (3)
2011 - DJ Izoh (2)
2011 - Co-Ma (3)
2012 - DJ Izoh (1)
2013 - DJ Fummy
2014 - DJ Hi-C
2015 - DJ Shota
2016 - DJ Yuto (1)
2017 - DJ Rena (1)
2018 - DJ Fummy (2)
2019 - DJ Anonymous
2020 - 14 (issi)

New Zealand DJ Champions
1990 - Rhys B
1991 - Raw
2000 - Raw
2001 - P-Money (3rd equal DMC World Champion)
2002 - Alphabethead
2003 - CXL
2004 - Manchoo
2005 - Abbott
2008 - Impact
2009 - Impact
2013 - Gooda
2014 - Spell
2015 - Spell (2nd DMC World Champion)
2016 - Ruse
2017 - Spell (1st DMC Online World Champion)
2017 - Gooda
2018 - K-Swizz (1st DMC World Supremacy Champion) Youngest ever 14yrs
2019 - K-Swizz (2nd DMC World Champion) & (2nd DMC World Supremacy Champion) & (2nd DMC Online World Champion)
2020 - K-Swizz (1st Rest of the World Champion) & (3rd DMC World Champion)
2021 - K-Swizz (1st Rest of the World Champion) & (2nd DMC World Champion)
2022 - K-Swizz (1st DMC World Champion) & (1st DMC Beat Juggling World Champion)

Philippines DJ Champions
1991 - DJ MOD (Master of Disaster)
1992 - The Mega Team (DJ MOD, DJ Sonny, DJ Ouch)
1993 - Dub Meeh Cramps (Dubmenext, DJ Meeh!, DJ Cramps)
1994/5 - DJ Kid
1996 - Radikal MK
1997 - DJ Kid
1998 - DJ Coki
1999 - DJ Sir Scratch
2000 - Radikal MK
2001 - DJ Coki
2002 - DJ Sir Scratch
2003 - Jam Masta
2004 - DJ Rocky Rock
2005 - Jam Masta
2006 - DJ Supreme Fist
2007 - Jam Masta
2008 - Skin Kadafi
2009 - Jam Masta
2010 - Jam Masta
2011 - Jam Masta
2012 - DJ Gilbert
2013 - DJ Gilbert
2014 - DJ Encee
2015 - jm_clubking23
2016 - jm_clubking23
2017 - jm_clubking23
2018 - DJ Sir Scratch
2019 - jm_clubking23

"Rest of the World" DJ Champions

In 2020, due to the COVID-19 pandemic the National Championship were also held online. Countries without a ruling DMC governing body competed in a "Rest of the World" battle.

2020 - DJ K-SWIZZ (New Zealand)
2021 - DJ K-SWIZZ (New Zealand)

Spain DJ Champions
1986 - Mike Platinas
1987 - Mike Platinas
1988 - Dimas "D-Formation" Carbajo
1989 - Dimas "D-Formation" Carbajo
1990 - Pedro Cortes
1991 - Tony Technics
1992 - Ricardo Matias & Miguel Angel Arpres
1994 - DJ Attack (team)
1995 - Gonzalo
1996 - Loomy
1997 - Loomy
1998 - Loomy
1999 - Dare
2000 - Tedu
2001 - Jekey
2002 - Jekey
2003 - Jekey
2006 - Loomy
2014 - Datflex
2020 - Datflex 
2021 - Dj CHK & Dj Datflex (tie 15 pnts)
2022 - DJ Ricardo

Sweden DJ Champions
1985 - Roger Tuuri (3rd)
1986 - Roger Tuuri (4th)
1987 - Robert "Micro" Molnar
1988 - Rob Wåtz
1989 - Rasmus Lindvall
1990 - Robert "Micro" Molnar 
1991 - 1st Björn Starfeldt 2.Pierre Jerksten 3.Mika Snickars
1992 - Pierre Jerksten
1993-94 - 1210 Jazz
1994-95 - 1210 Jazz
1996 - 1st Tony "Cole" Marasevic 2.Willrock 3.Mika Snickars
1997 - 1st Amato 2.Mika Snickars 3.1210 Jazz
1998 - 1st Mika Snickars 2. Tie Camilo/Fanatic 
1999 - 1210 Jazz
2000 - Amato
2003 - 1st Confuze 2.Kid Sid 3.Node
2004 - 1st Kid Sid 2.Ego 3.Technical
2005 - 1st Kid Sid 2.Prao D 3.Ego
2006 - 1st Kid Sid 
2007 - Ego
2008 - Alex Norberg
2015 - Besh One 
2021 - Dj Camilo (Rest of the world finalist)
2022 - Dj Camilo (world finalist, beatjuggling and foundation category)

Switzerland DJ Champions
1986 - Patrick Zuerrer
1987 - Rolf Anderegg
1988 - KZ
1989 - Keys One
1990 - Keys One
1991 - Jeff
1992 - Jeff
1993 - Jeff
1997 - Goo
1998 - Jay-K
1999 - Jay-K
2000 - Sensay
2001 - Jay-K
2002 - Jay-K

Thailand DJ Champions
2020 - DJ Steez

Turkey DJ Champions
1997 — DJ ACE
1998 — DJ ACE

Battle for World Supremacy Champions
2000 - Kodh (France) def. Skully (UK)
2001 - Netik (France) def. Snayk Eyez (US)
2002 - Netik (France)
2003 - Tigerstyle (UK) def. M-Rock (Canada)
2004 - Akakabe (Japan) def. Silk Kuts (UK)
2005 - Pro Zeiko (Germany)
2006 - Co-Ma (Japan)
2007 - DJ Shiftee (USA)
2008 - DJ Switch (UK)
2009 - DJ Switch (UK) def. DJ Nelson (France)
2010 - DJ Switch (UK) def. Getback (France)
2011 - DJ Nelson (France) def. Norihito (Japan)
2012 - DJ Vekked (Canada) def. Ritchie Ruftone (UK)
2013 - Ritchie Ruftone (UK) def. DJ Vekked (Canada)
2014 - IFTW (USA) def. DJ Vekked (Canada)
2015 - DJ Precision (USA) def. DJ Erick Jay (Brazil)
2016 - DJ Erick Jay (Brazil) def. DJ Fummy (Japan)
2017 - DJ Yukichi (Japan) def. DJ Dwells (USA)
2018 - DJ K-SWIZZ (New Zealand) - Youngest winner at age 14
2019 - DJ Matsunaga (Japan)
2021 - DJ Erick Jay (Brazil)
2022 - DJ Topic (France) def. DJ Erick Jay (Brazil)

Breakdown by country (20 in total):
 5 UK
 5 France
 4 Japan
 3 USA
 2 Brazil
 1 Canada
 1 Germany
 1 New Zealand

Battle For Supremacy (UK) Champions
(and world rankings)
2000 - Skully (2nd)
2001 - Madcut
2002 - Ritchie Ruftone 
2003 - Tigerstyle (1st)
2004 - Silk Kuts (2nd)
2005 - Matman
2006 - DJ Switch - youngest UK champion of any category aged 17
2007 - DJ Switch
2008 - DJ Switch (1st)
2009 - DJ Rasp
2009 - DJ Switch - Defending Battle For World Supremacy (1st)
2010 - Deceptakut
2010 - DJ Switch - Defending Battle For World Supremacy (1st)
2011 - DJ Dissect
2012 - Ritchie Ruftone - Returns to DMC 10 years later
2013 - Ritchie Ruftone (1st)
2014 - Ritchie Ruftone - Defending champion
2014 - DJ Rasp
2015 - Ritchie Ruftone - 2nd place Dj El Statiko represented uk at the dmc worlds
2016 - DJ X-Rated
2017 - DJ X-Rated
2018 - DJ Koncept

Battle For Supremacy (US) Champions
(And world rankings)

2000 - DJ Supa Dave
2000 - DJ Snayk Eyez
2001 - DJ Snayk Eyez (2nd)
2001 - DJ Tragik
2001 - DJ Impereal
2002 - DJ Kico
2003 - ie.Merg
2004 - ie.Merg
2005 - DJ I-Dee
2006 - DJ Etronik
2007 - DJ Shiftee (1st)
2008 - DJ SPS
2009 - DJ Supreme
2010 - DJ Solo
2011 - DJ Fascinate
2012 - DJ Esquire
2013 - DJ Etronik
2014 - IFTW (1st)
2015 - DJ Precision (1st)
2016 - DJ Etronik
 2017 - DJ Dwells (2nd)
 2018 - DJ Toltech
 2019 - DJ As-One

World Team Champions
1999 - Scratch Perverts (UK) - Prime Cuts, Tony Vegas, Mr Thing, First Rate
2000 - The Allies (USA/Canada) - Craze, A Trak
2001 - Perverted Allies (UK/USA/Canada) - Prime Cuts, Tony Vegas, Craze, Infamous
2002 - Birdy Nam Nam (France) - Crazy B, Need, Lil Mike, Pone
2003 - C2C (France) - Pfel, Atom, Greem, 20Syl
2004 - C2C (France)
2005 - C2C (France)
2006 - C2C (France)
2007 - Kireek (Japan) - Hi-C, Yasa
2008 - Kireek (Japan)
2009 - Kireek (Japan)
2010 - Kireek (Japan)
2011 - Kireek (Japan) - The first team to win 5 world championships in a row.
2012 - The Mixfitz (Belgium) - DJ Jack, DJ Damented, DJ Cross
2013 - 9 O'clock (France) - DJ Hertz, Aociz & Mr Viktor
2014 - 9 O'clock (France)
2015 - 9 O'clock (France)
2016 - DJ Netik & DJ Fly (France)
2017 - The Fresherthans (Canada) - Vekked, DJ Brace
2021 - Brexecutioners (UK)
2022 - Needlework Scratch Crew (Poland)

Breakdown by country (19 in total):
 9 France
 5 Japan
 3 Canada
 3 UK
 2 USA
 1 Belgium
 1 Poland

UK Team Champions
(and world rankings)
1999 - Scratch Perverts (1st)
1999 - The En4cers (2nd)
2000 - The Mixologists (3rd)
2001 - The Mixologists (2nd)
2002 - Flaredycats
2003 - Truesicians
2004 - The Disablists - Mighty Atom, Asian Hawk and Clever Monkey
2005 - The Disablists (3rd)
2006 - The Disablists (2nd)
2007 - The Disablists
2008 - Bionic Stylus - DJ Switch, FuriousP, Cable, Loop Skywalker
2009 - Bionic Stylus (3rd)
2010 - Bionic Stylus (3rd)
2011 - Invincible Armour
2012 - N/A
2013 - Bionic Stylus
2014 - N/A
2015 - N/A
2016 - N/A

US Team Champions
(And world rankings)
1999 - The Allies- Craze, A Trak, Infamous (2nd)
1999 - The Immortal Fader Fyters
2000 - The Allies- Craze, A Trak (1st)
2001 - Superfriends
2002 - Evolution DJs
2003 - Evolution DJs
2004 - Evolution DJs
2005 - Battle-Star
2006 - Animal Crackers
2007 - N/A
2008 - Angry EXs
2009 - Battle-Star: Turbulence & Phonics
2010 - Battle-Star: Turbulence & Phonics
2011 - Battle-Star: Turbulence & Phonics (3rd)
2012 - BattleStar Massive: Cwitch, Virusss, Rayted R & Image (4th)
2013 - BattleStar Massive: Cwitch, Virusss & Rayted R (3rd)
2014 - Chicago Turntablist Authority: Ambidecktriks, Toltech & RTST (4th)
2015 - Chicago Turntablist Authority: Ambidecktriks, Toltech, J.Marz & RTST
2016 - Chicago Turntablist Authority: Toltech, J.Marz & RTST
2017 - N/A
2018 - N/A

DMC Online World Champions

2011 - DJ Unkutt (Germany)
2012 - DJ Fong Fong (France) 
2013 - Jon1st (UK)
2014 - DJ I-Dee (USA)
2015 - DJ Vekked (Canada)
2016 - DJ Brace (Canada), 2. DJ Buruaaaa (Japan)
2017 - Spell (New Zealand)
2018 - DJ Skillz (France)
2019 - 1. DJ Erick Jay (Brazil), 2. K-Swizz (New Zealand), 3. DJ Buruaaaa (Japan)
2020 - DJ Skillz (France)

DMC Online Team Champions

2015 - The Fresherthans (Canada) - Winners of the First Tournament
2016 - DJ Fly & DJ Netik (France)
2017 - The Fresherthans (Canada)
2021 - Brexecutioners (UK)
2022 - Needlework Scratch Crew (Poland)

DMC World DJ Hall of Fame Champion

1996 - DJ Cheese - (1986 World Champion)
1997 - Cash Money - (1988 World Champion)
1998 - The DreamTeam - (2 time World Champion & 1992 USA Champions)
1999 - Roc Raida - (1995 World Champion)
2000 - Chad Jackson - (1987 World Champion & 2 time UK Champion)
2001 - Cutmaster Swift - (1989 World Champion & 2 time UK Champion)
2002 - DJ David - (The first World Champion twice 1990/1991)
2003 - DJ Craze - (3x World Champion, 2000 World Team Champions W/A-Trak, 2x USA Team Champions)
2004 - Roger Johnson - (The first Champion of DMC)
2005 - DJ Kentaro - (2002 World Champion & 2001 Japan Champion)
2006 - DJ Noize - (1996 World Champion)
2007 - A-Trak (1997 World Champion)
2008 - Scratch Perverts - (The first World Team Champions)
2009 - C2C - (4x Team World Champion)
2010 - KOHD - (First DMC Battle For World Supremacy champion)
2011 - Plus One - (2001 World Champion & the first DJ to receive multiple nominations)
2012 - DJ Netik - (2006 World Champion, 2x Battle for World Supremacy)
2012 - Birdy Nam Nam - (2002 World Team champions)
2013 - DJ Dopey - (2003 DMC World Champion)
2013 - DJ Tigerstyle - (2003 Battle For World Supremacy champion)
2013 - Kireek - (5x World Team Champions in a row)
2014 - DJ Akakabe (2004 Battle for World Supremacy)
2014 - DJ Switch (2014 World Champion & 3x Battle for World Supremacy)
2015 - DJ Vekked (2015 World Champion and Online Champion, 2012 Battle for Supremacy Champion)
2015 - Pro-Zeiko (2005 Battle for World Supremacy Champion)
2015 - DJ Q*Bert (Part of the DreamTeam 1992, 1993/1994 champions)
2016 - DJ Unkut (First Online World Champion)
2016 - The Allies (2000 World Team Champions)
2016 - DJ Co-Ma (2006 Battle for World Supremacy)
2017 - DJ Rafik (2007 World Champion)
2018 - DJ Fly (2008 & 2013 World Champion, also 2007 France DMC Champion, 2016 World Team Champion along DJ Netik, in 2011 his showcase set was considered the best routine of all time in a poll in the official DMC website)
2018 - DJ Fong Fong (2012 Online World Champion)
2018 - Mix Master Mike (Part of the DreamTeam 1992, 1993/1994 champions)
2019 - DJ Shiftee (2009 World DMC Champion, 2007 Battle for World Supremacy champion)
2019 - DJ Skillz (2018 & 2019 World champion, 2018 Online champion, 6x France DMC champion)
2020 - DJ LigOne (DMC World Champion 2010 and France DMC champion)
2020 - DJ Yasa (Part of Kireek as 5x World Team Champions and 2003, 2006 and 2007 Japan DMC champion)
2020 - Crazy B (2002 World Team Champion along with team Birdy Nam Nam and France DMC champion in 1991, 1996, 1997 and 1998)
2021 - DJ Nelson (2011 Battle for World Supremacy, France Battle for World Supremacy in 2008, 2009 & 2011)
2021 - DJ Vajra fka. Chris Karns (2011 World DMC Champion)

See also

List of hip hop music festivals
List of electronic music festivals
Live electronic music

References

External links
DMC History - DMC World DJ Championships (official championship history)
Battle Chronicles #1: Pasha Kamber — 1991 DMC Germany Finals

Music festivals established in 1985
DJing
British music awards
Electronic music festivals in Greece